The 2016–17 season of the Primera División de Fútbol Sala was the 28th season of top-tier futsal in Spain. It was the sixth season under the "Primera División" name. The regular season started on October 11, 2016, and ended on April 29, 2017. The championship playoffs followed the end of the regular season.

Movistar Inter defeated FC Barcelona Lassa 3 games to 2 in Championship Final series, winning its twelfth title overall and fourth in a row.

Elche V. Alberola and UMA Antequera finished in the last two places in the league and so were relegated at the end of the 2015-2016 regular season. ElPozo Ciudad de Murcia won the league, but are unable to be promoted because a club's "B" team cannot play in the top division. Plásticos Romero were promoted as highest ranking side from the Segunda División de Futsal. Gran Canaria won the promotion playoffs 2 games to 0 over Naturpellet Segovia and became the second team promoted to the Primera Division after a two-year absence from the top flight.

Teams

Regular season

Standings

Results

Championship Playoffs

Calendar

Bracket

Statistics

Top scorers

Hat-tricks

Note
4 Player scored 4 goals

See also
2016–17 Segunda División de Futsal

References

2016-17
2016–17 in Spanish futsal
Spain